Hypercompe campinasa is a moth of the family Erebidae first described by William Schaus in 1938. It is found in Brazil.

The larvae have been recorded feeding on Gossypium herbaceum.

References

campinasa
Moths described in 1938